The Eurotunnel Class 0031 0-4-0 diesel locomotives were built by the Hunslet Engine Company between 1989 and 1990 for Channel Tunnel construction work and now used for maintenance duties.

Twelve locomotives were built, numbered 0031–0042. They carry a yellow livery and are used by Getlink for shunting duties at Cheriton and Coquelles depots.

Names
All the locomotives are named:
 0031 Frances
 0032 Elisabeth
 0033 Silke
 0034 Amanda
 0035 Mary
 0036 Lawrence
 0037 Lydie
 0038 Jenny
 0039 Pacita
 0040 Jill
 0041 Kim
 0042 Nicole

References

0031
B locomotives
Hunslet locomotives
Channel Tunnel
900 mm gauge locomotives
Standard gauge locomotives of Great Britain
Standard gauge locomotives of France
Railway locomotives introduced in 1993